Xtra Mile Recordings are a British independent record label based in London, England. The label was founded in 2003 by Charlie Caplowe and they release an eclectic mix of genres with a focus on rock and folk.

History
The label first signed the artists Million Dead and Reuben in 2003 and subsequently released Frank Turner's solo albums after the split of Million Dead in 2005. While signed with Xtra Mile, Frank Turner has gone on to perform at the opening ceremony of the London 2012 Olympics and sell out Wembley Arena.

On 8 August 2011 Xtra Mile were badly affected by the 2011 England riots, when the Sony Music warehouse that stored their records was set on fire.

Since the label's inception it has continued to support and break new artists and bands. Xtra Mile has released numerous charting albums from acts including Skinny Lister and Will Varley. In recent years the label has announced distribution deals outside the UK in countries such as the US & Canada.

On 4 July 2017, Xtra Mile were featured on BBC Radio 1's Independents' Day Takeover hosted by Huw Stevens.

Artists

Current
List of artists on Xtra Mile Recordings:
Against Me!
Algiers
Beans on Toast
Ben Marwood
BERRIES
Billy Pettinger 
Cheap Girls
Chris T-T
Counterfeit
Deux Furieuses
Dive Dive
Frank Turner
Glossary
God Fires Man
Half Noise
Jonah Matranga
Joshua English
Lights.Action!
The Maybes?
Möngöl Hörde
Northcote
Oxygen Thief
Pet Needs
Recreations
Rob Lynch
A Silent Film
Saint Leonard's Horses
Skinny Lister
Sonic Boom Six
Stapleton
Straight Lines (formerly Said Mike)
Sucioperro
To Kill A King
The Xcerts

Alumni
List of artists no longer with Xtra Mile Recordings:
DARTZ!
Future Of The Left
Million Dead
My Luminaries
My Vitriol
Reuben
The Rifles
This Et Al
Will Varley

See also
 List of record labels

References

External links
Website
News Blog
MySpace profile
 Last.fm label page
YouTube Channel
Discogs page
Xtra Mile Recordings feature on Rockmidgets.com

British independent record labels
Record labels established in 2003
Rock record labels
Indie rock record labels
Alternative rock record labels